Shindō-Higashi Station (新道東駅) is a Sapporo Municipal Subway in Higashi-ku, Sapporo, Hokkaido, Japan. The station number is H02.

Platforms

Surrounding area
 Japan National Route 274 (to Shibecha)
 Sapporo-Kita 38 Post Office
 AEON Sapporo Motomachi, shopping center
 Tsutaya store, Sapporo-Kita branch
 Sapporo Higashi Tokushukai Hospital
 Maxvalu Supermarket, Express Shindo branch
 Hotel Tomo
 Hotel Yukita
 Hokkaido shinkin Bank, Sapporo-Kita branch

External links

 Sapporo Subway Stations

Railway stations in Japan opened in 1988
Railway stations in Sapporo
Sapporo Municipal Subway
Higashi-ku, Sapporo